Crassispira cerithoidea is a species of sea snail, a marine gastropod mollusk in the family Pseudomelatomidae.

Description
The length varies between 10 mm and 17 mm.

Distribution
This species occurs in the Pacific Ocean from Mazatlan, Mexico to Panama

References

 Carpenter P.P. (1857) - Catalogue of the collection of Mazatlan shells in the British Museum, collected by Frederick Reigen

External links
 
 

cerithoidea
Gastropods described in 1857
Taxa named by Philip Pearsall Carpenter